1067 Lunaria, provisional designation , is a stony Itha asteroid from the outer regions of the asteroid belt, approximately 18 kilometers in diameter. It was discovered on 9 September 1926, by astronomer Karl Reinmuth at the Heidelberg-Königstuhl State Observatory in southwest Germany. The asteroid was named after the flowering plant Lunaria (honesty).

Orbit and classification 

Lunaria is a member of the Itha family, a very small family of asteroids, named after its parent body 918 Itha.

It orbits the Sun in the outer asteroid belt at a distance of 2.3–3.4 AU once every 4 years and 10 months (1,777 days; semi-major axis of 2.87 AU). Its orbit has an eccentricity of 0.19 and an inclination of 11° with respect to the ecliptic. The body's observation arc begins at Heidelberg in October 1926, one month after its official discovery observation.

Physical characteristics 

Lunaria has been characterized as both L- and S-type asteroid by Pan-STARRS photometric survey. The overall spectral type for the Itha family is that of a stony S-type.

Rotation period 

In July 1984, a first rotational lightcurve of Lunaria was obtained by American astronomer Richard Binzel. Lightcurve analysis gave a rotation period of 7.74 hours with a brightness variation of 0.13 magnitude. In September 2004, Donald Pray at the Carbuncle Hill Observatory derived a refined period of 6.057 hours with an amplitude of 0.27 magnitude from photometric observations.

Diameter and albedo 

According to the surveys carried out by the Japanese Akari satellite and the NEOWISE mission of NASA's Wide-field Infrared Survey Explorer, Lunaria measures between 15.43 and 22.968 kilometers in diameter and its surface has an albedo between 0.1240 and 0.298.

The Collaborative Asteroid Lightcurve Link assumes a standard albedo for stony asteroids of 0.20 and derives a diameter of 18.07 kilometers based on an absolute magnitude of 11.08.

Naming 

This minor planet was named after Lunaria (commonly known as "honesty"), a flowering plant in the mustard family. The official naming citation was mentioned in The Names of the Minor Planets by Paul Herget in 1955.

Reinmuth's flowers 

Due to his many discoveries, Karl Reinmuth submitted a large list of 66 newly named asteroids in the early 1930s. This list also contained a sequence of 28 asteroids, starting with 1054 Forsytia, that were exclusively named after plants, in particular flowering plants (also see list of minor planets named after animals and plants).

References

External links 
 Asteroid Lightcurve Database (LCDB), query form (info )
 Dictionary of Minor Planet Names, Google books
 Asteroids and comets rotation curves, CdR – Observatoire de Genève, Raoul Behrend
 Discovery Circumstances: Numbered Minor Planets (1)-(5000) – Minor Planet Center
 
 

001067
Discoveries by Karl Wilhelm Reinmuth
Named minor planets
19260909